AmericanMuscle is an American online retailer of automotive parts and accessories for Ford Mustang and Ford F-150 (F-Series truck) model automobiles. Founded by Steve Voudouris, it is one of the flagship brands and websites of Turn5 Inc., a holding company that owns and operates a group of specialty after market parts companies.

History

The AmericanMuscle brand began in 2003 when the company was operating from a home garage and was managed by two of its current executives—brothers Steve Voudouris and Andrew Voudouris. Today, AmericanMuscle operates from the company's Malvern, Pennsylvania headquarters, which includes a 200,000 square foot warehouse, video room, training room and design area and is one of the largest suppliers of aftermarket Ford Mustang and Ford F-150 performance parts in North America.

The founding partners were awarded the Small Business Administration's Young Entrepreneur of the Year Award in 2009 for their success in building the company's forebear, Xoxide while still in high school. In 2009, the company changed its name to Turn5 Inc, and sold the Xoxide website to gaming equipment manufacturer and distributor, eDimensional Inc.

Philanthropy

AmericanMuscle Charity Mustang Show

AmericanMuscle is the host of the annual AmericanMuscle Mustang Show. Originating in 2008 as a customer appreciation day in the company's Malvern, Pennsylvania headquarters, the AmericanMuscle Mustang show has evolved into the largest one day all Mustang car show in the world.

Through the Mustang Car Show's fund-raising activities and efforts, AmericanMuscle has raised and donated more than $150,000 in cash to non-profit organizations.

At its 7th annual Car Show in 2015, The AmericanMuscle team rebuilt a 2000 V6 Mustang for a terminally ill 18-year-old named Jonathan to fulfill his 'Make-A-Wish' dream.

In 2017, the Turn5 team donated $126,751 to the 'Make-A-Wish' foundation.

AmericanMuscle Student Scholarship Program

In 2013 AmericanMuscle began offering four annual scholarships for $2,000 each to students in the US and Canada pursuing an automotive related field of study. AmericanMuscle has awarded 14 scholarships totaling $28,000 since the program's inception.

Awards
 Entrepreneur Magazine - Hot 500 Award: 2007
 Bizrate - Platinum Award for Customer Service Excellence: 2014, 2013, 2012, 2011

References

Automotive part retailers of the United States
American companies established in 2003
Retail companies established in 2003
Internet properties established in 2003